Ghosted: Love Gone Missing is an American reality-based documentary television series airing on MTV about ghosting, which premiered on September 10, 2019. The series is co-hosted by Rachel Lindsay and Travis Mills.

The second season premiered on September 2, 2020. It was hosted virtually due to the COVID-19 pandemic.

Episodes

Series overview

Season 1 (2019)

Season 2 (2020–21)

References

External links
 Ghosted: Love Gone Missing at MTV
 Ghosted: Love Gone Missing at IMDb
 Ghosted: Love Gone Missing at Rotten Tomatoes

2010s American reality television series
2019 American television series debuts
MTV original programming
2020s American reality television series
2021 American television series endings
Television series impacted by the COVID-19 pandemic